Christiane Sophie Charlotte of Brandenburg-Kulmbach (15 October 1733 in Neustadt an der Aisch – 8 October 1757 in Jagdschloss Seidingstadt in Straufhain) was a member of the Kulmbach-Bayreuth branch of the Franconian line of the House of Hohenzollern and was, by marriage, Duchess of Saxe-Hildburghausen.

Life 
Christiane Sophie Charlotte was the only surviving child of Margrave Frederick Christian of Brandenburg-Bayreuth from his marriage to Victoria Charlotte, the daughter of Prince Victor Amadeus Adolf I of Anhalt-Bernburg-Schaumburg-Hoym.

Christiane Sophie Charlotte was raised in Copenhagen, at the court of her aunt, Queen of Denmark Sophia Magdalene of Denmark, together with her cousin Louise.  After mediation by her aunt, Christiane married on 20 January 1757 at Christiansborg Palace to the Queen's former son-in-law Duke Ernest Frederick III of Saxe-Hildburghausen.

Christiane was describe as very pious; however, and unlike her predecessor (who had insisted on rigid court etiquette), she had a lavish lifestyle, with elaborate parties and had a special fondness for hunting. At the entrance of the former Jagdschloss Seidinstadt, two antlers are on display, from two deer she shot while hunting in 1757. She died in childbirth, four days after giving birth to Princess Marie Sophie Friederike Caroline, who died nine days later.

References 
Heinrich Ferdinand Schoeppl: Die Herzoge von Sachsen-Altenburg, Bolzano, 1917, reprinted: Altenburg, 1992
Dr. Rudolf Armin Human: Chronik der Stadt Hildburghausen, Hildburghausen, 1886

|-

House of Hohenzollern
Duchesses of Saxe-Hildburghausen
1733 births
1757 deaths
Deaths in childbirth
Daughters of monarchs